Senator Bair may refer to:

Myrna L. Bair (born 1940), Delaware State Senate
Steve Bair (born 1958), Idaho State Senate